This is a list of notable people related to the University of Keele and its predecessor, the University College of North Staffordshire.

Presidents and Chancellors
 John Herbert Dudley Ryder, 5th Earl of Harrowby (1949–55)
 HRH Princess Margaret (1956–86)
 Claus Moser, Baron Moser (1986–2002)
 Sir David Weatherall (2002–2012)
 Sir Jonathon Porritt (2012–2022)
 James Timpson (2022-...)

Principals and Vice-Chancellors
 Lord Lindsay of Birker (1949–52)
 Sir John Lennard-Jones (1953–54)
 Sir George Barnes (1956–60)
 Harold McCarter Taylor (1961–67)
 W. A. Campbell Stewart (1967–79)
 Sir David Harrison (1979–84)
 Sir Brian Fender (1985–95)
 Dame Janet Finch (1995–2010)
 Nick Foskett (2010–2015)
 Trevor McMillan (2015– )

Academics

 Tony Barrand – Professor Emeritus of Anthropology, Boston University
 Jonathan Dollimore – English sociologist
 Richard English – historian
 Roy Fisher – American Studies lecturer and poet
 Jill Gibbon – graphic artist
 Oliver Harris – professor of American literature and expert in the works of William Burroughs
 Sir Nick Partridge – British health care specialist
 Dame Joan Kathleen Stringer – British political scientist

Alumni

References

Keele University
Keele